The New York State Financial Control Board was created in 1975 following a financial crisis and state bailout to oversee municipal spending. The board included both government officials and citizen representatives.

The board was created pursuant to the New York State Financial Emergency Act of The City of New York, and was initially known as the Emergency Financial Control Board (EFCB). Three years later the word "Emergency" was removed from the group's name and its charter was extended for thirty years. While direct management of the city's budget ended in 1986, the board continues to monitor the city's financial health.

The mayor of New York City and the governor of New York State both serve on the seven-member board.

See also
 New York State Authorities Budget Office
 New York State Comptroller
 New York State Public Authorities Control Board

References

External links
 State of New York Financial Control Board

State agencies of New York (state)
1975 establishments in New York (state)